Bastian Dankert (born 9 June 1980) is a German football referee who is based in Rostock. He referees for Brüsewitzer SV of the Mecklenburg-Vorpommern State Football Association. He is a FIFA referee, and is ranked as a UEFA second category referee.

Refereeing career
Dankert became a DFB referee in 2008, a Bundesliga referee in 2012, and a FIFA referee in 2014.

On 30 April 2018, Dankert was selected by FIFA as one of the video assistant referees for the 2018 FIFA World Cup in Russia, the first FIFA World Cup to use the technology.

Personal life
Dankert lives in Rostock and is a sports scientist. In his main profession he is the general manager and marketing director at Landesfußballverband Mecklenburg-Vorpommern e. V.

References

External links
 Bastian Dankert at DFB 
 
 
 
 

1980 births
Living people
Sportspeople from Schwerin
People from Bezirk Schwerin
German football referees
UEFA Champions League referees
UEFA Europa League referees
2018 FIFA World Cup referees
21st-century German people